SS Japara was a freighter of  built by Mach. Fabr. & Scheepswerf P. Smit Jr., Rotterdam in 1930 and operated by Koninklijke Paketvaart-Maatschappij (KPM) in the Dutch East Indies trade. The 1930 Japara was operating with the United States Army permanent local fleet of the U.S. Army Forces in Australia (USAFIA) from 1942 until 1945 even while the larger ship, was active in Army service oceanwide. Japara of 1930 played an important logistics role in the New Guinea Campaign.

World War II
Japara was one of twenty-one KPM vessels that took refuge in Australian ports after the fall of Java that Dutch officials requested be put into service for the war effort. The ship, among others, was chartered by the Chief Quartermaster, U.S. Army Forces in Australia (USAFIA) on 26 March 1942 with long term details to be negotiated at higher levels to become part of the U.S. Army's local fleet crewed by its KPM officers and men with an Army local fleet number of X-18 being assigned until released from the fleet May 1945.

Logistical support of Allied offensive operations on the north coast of New Guinea by sea required establishment of a port west of Milne Bay at Oro Bay and a route by which large ships could pass through the largely uncharted and hazardous waters between. Small vessels transporting supplies in the early stages and survey vessels found that route and convoys code named Operation Lilliput were put into place to run two large ships under escort of one or two corvettes to Oro Bay in what were termed "flights" and given numbers. Japara was in a convoy of nine ships that departed Townsville 15 November 1942 that split on 17 November into a contingent going to Port Moresby and four, Japara,  and J. B. Ashe  under escort of corvettes headed to Milne Bay with the three Dutch ships to become the first "flights" of Lilliput.

The ship arrived with the troops, 750 tons of cargo, Australian pontoon barges to form a new docking facility and the Commander, Combined Operational Service Command (COSC) detachment for Oro Bay that would operate the growing port on the night of 19 December and was unloaded and away from danger by daylight.

Fate
Japara was sold in 1958 to Wheelock & Marden & Co., Panama and renamed Davric. She was sold in 1963 renamed Phoenix, sold in 1966 renamed East Head, sold in 1967 renamed Arrow Head, sold in 1968 renamed Moji Trader and lastly sold in 1969 and renamed Victory which was scrapped in Hong Kong in 1969.

Footnotes

References
Notes

Bibliography

1930 ships
Ships built in Rotterdam
Merchant ships of the Netherlands
World War II merchant ships of the Netherlands